Statistics of Swiss Super League in the 1944–45 season.

Overview
It was contested by 14 teams, and Grasshopper Club Zürich won the championship.

League standings

Results

Sources 
 Switzerland 1944–45 at RSSSF

Swiss Football League seasons
Swiss
Football